Atina Johnston (Ford) is not to be confused with Anita Ford, her mother and former coach

Atina Johnston (born October 12, 1971, as Atina Ford) is a Canadian curler, world champion and Olympic champion from Gray, Saskatchewan. She won a gold medal at the 1998 Winter Olympics in Nagano. She won the World Championships in 1997 as an alternate for the Sandra Schmirler team. After winning the 1990 Canadian Junior Curling Championships in Sudbury, Ontario, she received a bronze medal in the 1991 World Junior Curling Championships in Glasgow as skip for the Canadian team.

References

1971 births
Living people
Canadian women curlers
Olympic curlers of Canada
Curlers at the 1998 Winter Olympics
Olympic gold medalists for Canada
World curling champions
Curlers from Saskatchewan
Canadian people of German descent
Olympic medalists in curling
Medalists at the 1998 Winter Olympics
Canada Cup (curling) participants